The Republic of Korea (South Korea) competed, under the name Korea, at the 2010 Winter Paralympics in Vancouver.

Alpine skiing 

Men

Biathlon

Cross-country skiing

Ice sledge hockey 

South Korea competed in ice sledge hockey.

Wheelchair curling 

South Korea competed in wheelchair curling, placing second, which earned them a silver medal.

See also
South Korea at the 2010 Winter Olympics
South Korea at the Paralympics

References

External links
Vancouver 2010 Paralympic Games official website
International Paralympic Committee official website

Nations at the 2010 Winter Paralympics
2010
Paralympics